Dreamland is the seventh solo studio album by English musician Robert Plant and the first album with his backing band Strange Sensation. It was released on July 16, 2002. It is a mixture of blues rock, folk rock, hard rock, and psychedelic rock.

Overview
Many of the songs are cover versions, mainly blues, but also some rock. It was nominated for two Grammys in 2002 — Best Rock Album and Best Male Rock Vocal Performance for "Darkness, Darkness."

Track listing

Notes
 – based on Bukka White's "Fixin' to Die Blues", a song Led Zeppelin used to perform live.
 – contains elements of: "If I Ever Get Lucky" by Arthur "Big Boy" Crudup; "Milk Cow's Calf Blues" by Robert Johnson; "Crawling King Snake" by Big Joe Williams or John Lee Hooker; and "That's Alright Mama" by Arthur "Big Boy" Crudup.

Personnel

Strange Sensation
 Robert Plant – Vocals
 John Baggott – Keyboards, string arrangement on tracks 2, 3
 Pearl Thompson – Guitar
 Justin Adams – Guitars, Gimbri, Darbuka
 Charlie Jones – Bass
 Clive Deamer – Drums, Percussion

Guest musicians
 B. J. Cole – pedal steel guitar on track 5
 Raj Das, May Clee Cadman, Ginny Clee – backing vocals

Notes

References 

2002 albums
Robert Plant albums
Covers albums
Mercury Records albums
Universal Records albums